Titsey Place is an English country house near Oxted in Surrey, England. It was successively the seat of the Gresham and Leveson-Gower families and is now preserved by a charitable trust for the nation.

The house has its origins in a 16th-century house, which was built by Sir John Gresham (1495–1556) on the site of a earlier dwelling. The mostly Tudor house was demolished and rebuilt in the 18th century, before being refronted in 1826. Finally a tower was added in 1856.

History
In the Middle Ages, Titsey was owned by the Uvedale family. It was then an important house in the area, and its Uvedale owners were High Sheriffs of Surrey several times between 1393 and 1464, and also several times High Sheriffs of Hampshire between 1388 and 1493.

The Gresham family reached the peak of its power and wealth in the sixteenth century, and Sir John Gresham, a rich City of London merchant, acquired Titsey from the heirs of John Bourchier, 2nd Baron Berners, to whom it had been granted by Henry VIII. Gresham built a new house there near to the parish church, on the site of an older house. He was Lord Mayor of London in 1547.

Sir John Gresham's heir was William Gresham, whose son was Sir Thomas Gresham (died 1630), whose son and heir was Sir Edward Gresham. The house and estate passed through several generations of the Gresham family, who were created Baronets by Charles II at the time of his Restoration in 1660. The successive baronets were Sir Marmaduke Gresham, 1st Baronet (1627-1696), Sir Edward Gresham, 2nd Baronet (1649-1709), Sir Charles Gresham, 3rd Baronet (1660-1718), Sir Marmaduke Gresham, 4th Baronet (1700-1742), Sir Charles Gresham, 5th Baronet (died 1750), and Sir John Gresham, 6th and last Baronet (1735-1801). Through the marriage of the heiress of the last Gresham, the house passed to the Leveson Gowers, a branch of the family of the Dukes of Sutherland.

A Tudor house on the site was demolished and rebuilt by the last Gresham baronet in the 18th century, then in 1826 was given new fronts designed by William Atkinson. A tower by Philip Charles Hardwick was added in 1856.

John Preston Neale's Views of the Seats of Noblemen and Gentlemen, in England, Wales, Scotland, and Ireland (1821) notes that "The Mansion... stands in a beautiful dell formed by a range of lofty chalk hills sheltering it from the north."
A Topographical History of Surrey (1844) says of the house -

Many of the Uvedales are buried in the garden of Titsey Place, which contains the former parish graveyard. The last Gresham of Titsey pulled down the ancient parish church in 1776 and incorporated its site into his park. In 1865, a large yew-tree marked the location of the former church.

Sir Henry Gresham Leveson Gower (1873–1954), who was born at Titsey Place, was England cricket captain in 1909-1910. Frederick Leveson-Gower (1871–1946) also played first-class cricket.

The Leveson Gowers remained at Titsey until Thomas Leveson Gower died in 1992. By his Will, a charitable trust was established to preserve the house and gardens for the benefit of the public. The remainder of the estate was left to his heir, David Innes, who was also appointed Governor of the charitable trust.

Present day

House
The house is especially noted for its fine collection of family portraits, many of which are hung in the main entrance hall. Such noted artists as Sir Joshua Reynolds and Peter Lely are represented. The new dining room has four paintings of Venice by Canaletto. The panelled sitting-room has a notable antiquarian interior and the gallery bedroom has an impressive Georgian style.

Gardens
After being left in a run-down state by the Army after World War II, the majority of the gardens were restored by Thomas Smith and his team. Smith also built up a very impressive orchid collection and grew fruit and vegetables in the kitchen-garden for the estate and for the greengrocers in nearby Oxted. Since 1992, the house and remainder of the gardens have been restored and the kitchen-garden changed to a more Victorian style. Both are open to the public in the summer.

Titsey Place is supported by the Campaign to Protect Rural England.

See also
Titsey Woods
London to Lewes Way (Roman road)
Leveson-Gower
River Eden, Kent
Hazelwood School

References

External links
titsey.org, official web site

Historic house museums in Surrey
Gardens in Surrey
!